Sartangeh may refer to:
 Sartangeh, Mazandaran
 Sartangeh, Semnan